Edward Cairns Officer (19 September 1871 – 7 July 1921) was an Australian artist, inaugural president of the Australian Art Association.

Officer was born at Murray Downs, New South Wales, near Swan Hill, Victoria. He was the third son of Suetonius Henry Officer and his wife Mary Lillias Rigg, a daughter of the Rev. Adam Cairns. His grandfather, Sir Robert Officer, was speaker of the Tasmanian house of assembly for many years. Officer was educated at Toorak College and the National Gallery of Victoria. From there he went to Paris and studied at Julien's. He exhibited at leading exhibitions in Paris and London, and in 1903 was the winner of the Wynne prize awarded by the national gallery, Sydney.

In 1912 his painting, "The Woolshed", was purchased under the Alfred Felton bequest for the national gallery, Melbourne. At a meeting on 30 August 1912 which founded the Australian Art Association at Melbourne, he was elected its president and held the position for the rest of his life. He was appointed a trustee of the public library, museums and national gallery of Victoria in 1916. He died at Macedon, Victoria, on 7 July 1921. He married Grace, daughter of Sir Thomas Fitzgerald, who survived him. Officer who worked in oils did some excellent landscape work, restrained, sometimes low-toned, yet with a feeling for the open air.

References

1871 births
1921 deaths
Artists from New South Wales
Wynne Prize winners
20th-century Australian painters
20th-century Australian male artists
Australian male painters
National Gallery of Victoria Art School alumni